Camelia Gabriela Lupașcu (born 29 July 1986 in Dorohoi) is a Romanian rower. She finished 4th in the eight at the 2012 Summer Olympics.

References

External links 
 
 
 
 

1986 births
Living people
Romanian female rowers
Olympic rowers of Romania
Rowers at the 2012 Summer Olympics
World Rowing Championships medalists for Romania
European Rowing Championships medalists
People from Dorohoi